Íñigo Cervantes and Oriol Roca Batalla were the defending champions but only Cervantes chose to defend his title, partnering Pedro Cachín. Cervantes successfully defended his title.

Cachín and Cervantes won the title after defeating Ivan Gakhov and David Vega Hernández 7–6(7–5), 3–6, [10–5] in the final.

Seeds

Draw

References
 Main Draw

Copa Sevilla - Doubles
2017 Doubles